Alutgama may refer to:

 Alutgama (7°19'N 80°31'E), a village in Sri Lanka
 Alutgama (7°22'N 80°39'E), a village in Sri Lanka
 Alutgama (7°31'N 80°35'E), a village in Sri Lanka
 Alutgama (7°42'N 80°35'E), a village in Sri Lanka